Pavlos Dermitzakis (born 29 June 1969) is a Greek professional football manager and former player, who is the current manager of Super League 2 club Panserraikos.

Playing career
Dermitzakis began his football career in Kavala, playing for amateur local side Vyron Kavala. In 1987, he was acquired by the city's most prestigious club Kavala, where he played for five years in both the second and third tiers of the Greek football league system and scoring a total of 47 goals.

In 1992, Dermitzakis joined Alpha Ethniki side PAOK, where he spent the next three years of his career. In his last season with PAOK, he was not among coach Arie Haan's first choices, and as a result his playing time was severely limited. He made a total of 4 league appearances for PAOK during the 1994–95 Alpha Ethniki and another 4 in the Cup. He subsequently moved to fellow top-tier side Athinaikos for the first half of the 1995–96 season, followed by Kalamata for the second half, recording 9 and 13 caps for each side respectively.

The following years, Dermitzakis spent the remainder of his career on season-long contracts with various clubs playing in the Beta and Gamma Ethniki, consecutively signing with Ergotelis, Panegialios, EAR, Anagennisi Karditsa and Atromitos Athens and back to Ergotelis, until his retirement in 2001 to pursue a managerial career. During his 13-year professional career, Dermitzakis made a total of 327 caps and scored 106 goals across all three professional divisions of the Greek football league system.

Managerial career
Dermitzakis began his managerial career at Ergotelis, at the time playing in the Delta Ethniki, succeeding Myron Sifakis. He then moved to fellow Delta Ethniki Heraklion-based club Atsalenios, whom he also managed to promote to the Gamma Ethniki, this time as champions of Group 10. Dermitzakis cemented his post in Atsalenios, maintaining an undefeated home record during the 2005−06 and 2006−07 seasons in which the club finished in 4th and 3rd place respectively, narrowly missing out on promotion to the Beta Ethniki.

After his departure from Atsalenios in 2007, Dermitzakis moved to fellow Gamma Ethniki club Diagoras, achieving promotion to the Beta Ethniki as champions of the Southern Group, once again achieving an undefeated home record for the Rhodes-based club. He managed the club in the Beta Ethniki until 30 November 2009, when he resigned from his post to take over management of Superleague side Panthrakikos. Although Panthrakikos had already failed to avoid relegation when Dermitzakis took over, he managed to improve the Thracians performance and led the club to its first victories in the 2009−10 Superleague season.

In the summer of 2010, Dermitzakis was rumored to take over management of PAOK, who instead appointed Italian manager Mario Beretta as head coach for the club. Dermitzakis eventually replaced Beretta after his sacking in pre-season, but he was himself also fired a few months later on 17 October 2010, after three consecutive losses vs. Skoda Xanthi, fierce club rival Aris and Panathinaikos. On 21 January 2011, Dermitzakis agreed to take over fellow Superleague club Asteras Tripolis, but in May 2011 his contract was terminated on mutual consent.

On 31 October 2012 Dermitzakis returned to Panthrakikos once again in the Supereleague, again faced with difficult odds as he took over management with just six points on the Table after 8 match-days. Despite the odds, he did not only manage to stay clear of relegation, but also achieved the best ever finish of the club in the competition (10th place). He additionally managed to reach the Greek Cup Semi-Finals, where Panthrakikos were eventually eliminated by competition winners Olympiacos.

In 2013, Dermitzakis returned to Crete and briefly served as manager of Superleague club OFI. In September 2014 he returned to the club where he first started his managerial career, taking over management of Ergotelis also in the Greek Supereleague. However, he failed to improve Ergotelis' position in the League Table after replacing Spanish manager Juan Ferrando, and therefore the club terminated his contract three months later, in December 2014.

In January 2015, Dermitzakis was appointed manager of Football League side Lamia. He left the club shortly after, in March. In the summer of the same year, Dermitzakis moved to Cyprus and was hired by First Division club Ermis Aradippou. His contract was terminated in September, when the club's board of directors felt he did not meet club expectations.

In July 2020, Dermitzakis was appointed manager of Football League side Veria. Veria was crowned champion under Dermitzakis management for two consecutive seasons as they finished first in 2020–21 Football League winning promotion to Super League 2 where again they finished 1st in the 2021–22 Super League 2 North Group  but failed to win promotion through the play off games twice against Leviadiakos and Lamia. His contract expired on 30 June 2022 and the new club board decided not to renew his contract..

References

External links
 
 Alex. Mastrogiannopoulos (93.html to 95.html)

1969 births
Living people
Greek footballers
Kavala F.C. players
PAOK FC players
Athinaikos F.C. players
Kalamata F.C. players
Ergotelis F.C. players
Anagennisi Karditsa F.C. players
Atromitos F.C. players
Panegialios F.C. players
Association football forwards
Footballers from Kavala
Greek football managers
Ergotelis F.C. managers
Panthrakikos F.C. managers
PAOK FC managers
Asteras Tripolis F.C. managers
OFI Crete F.C. managers
PAS Lamia 1964 managers
Kavala F.C. managers
Veria NFC managers
Panserraikos F.C. managers
Expatriate football managers in Cyprus
Greek expatriate sportspeople in Cyprus